Santa Claus Village is an amusement park in Rovaniemi in the Lapland region of Finland. It was opened in 1985.

Location and transportation

The first original home of Santa Claus was Korvatunturi. In 1985, Rovaniemi was declared as an official hometown of Santa Claus.

Attractions

 Arctic Circle: The Arctic Circle ostensibly cuts right through Santa Claus Village. A white line denoting the Arctic Circle (at its position in 1865) is painted across the park. Visitors officially enter the Arctic area when they cross the line. The line is a trendy photo spot for visitors. The Arctic Circle is actually 700 meters to the north, just south of the Rovaniemi airport.)
 Santa's House of Snowmobiles: A museum about the history and evolution of snowmobiles in the Arctic areas.
 Santa Claus's Office: A Santa Claus's Office is located inside the main building of the Village, for visitors to take photographs and chat with Santa Claus. However, Santa Claus has an "office hour" and he may not be in the office all the time even when the Village is open.
 Northern Lights: also known as Aurora Borealis. The Northern Lights are observed on around 150 nights in a year from mid-August until early April. The Arctic Garden and the top of Ounasvaara fell are the best destinations to witness Northern Lights. The phenomena is caused by electrically charged particles from the sun colliding with air molecules in Earth's atmosphere and deflected by Earth's magnetic field. This process results in the emission of colourful light, visible at night. Green is the most common colour in this process, while red, pink, violet, yellow, and even blue may be observable too.

Awards
The Santa Claus Park that is connected to the Santa Claus Village was in 2007 awarded by Topworld International and placed as the second best Travel Adventure in Finland. Since 2008, it still holds second position after Topworld invited travellers to vote for their own Top 10 list over adventures.

References

External links

 

Santa Claus
Rovaniemi
Amusement parks in Finland
Buildings and structures in Lapland (Finland)
Tourist attractions in Lapland (Finland)
Christmas in Finland
1985 establishments in Finland
Amusement parks opened in 1985